Olympic Dreams is a British television series, a co-production between the BBC and the Open University, with the intent of tracking a group of young British athletes bidding for Olympic success at the 2012 Summer Olympics in London.

The first series of programmes were broadcast at the end of 2007. The second series started in July 2008.

The athletes being tracked are:

Jessica Ennis – heptathlete
Darius Knight, Paul Drinkhall – table tennis players
Shanaze Reade – BMX cyclist
Lee Pearson – paralympic dressage rider
Andy Triggs-Hodge, Alex Partridge, Pete Reed, Steve Williams – Men's coxless four
Tom Daley – diver
Ben Swift – cyclist
Jessica Hogg, Elizabeth Beddoe, Venus Romaeo – gymnasts

References

Further reading

External links
Open University official Olympic Dreams website
Olympic Dreams homepage

2000s British sports television series